Catherine Plunkett  (born c 1725), was an eighteenth century Irish violinist.

Biography 
She was born in Dublin about 1725. Plunkett studied with Matthew Dubourg and performed in London and Dublin about 1744. She was one of the very few Irish women to perform as a violinist on stage in the eighteenth century. Very little more is known about her.

In 1818 a Stradivarius cello was bought by Mr Alan Dowell, the "son of Ms Catherine Plunkett". This "Irish" cello turned up in London and is now owned by Carlos Prieto.

References and sources 

1725 births
Irish violinists
Date of death unknown
Women classical violinists